Steve Darcis was the defending champion, but lost in the second round. Malek Jaziri won the title defeating Igor Sijsling in the final 5–7, 7–5, 6–4

Seeds

Draw

Finals

Top half

Bottom half

References
 Main Draw
 Qualifying Draw

Open de Rennes - Singles
2015 Singles